"Dreamland" is a song by English synth-pop duo Pet Shop Boys featuring English synth-pop band Years & Years. It was released on 11 September 2019 as the lead single from Pet Shop Boys' fourteenth studio album, Hotspot (2020).

The release of the single coincided with the announcement of Pet Shop Boys' first ever greatest hits tour, titled Dreamworld: The Greatest Hits Live which the duo performed in arenas around the UK.

Background
During the writing process, Neil Tennant explained that the title of the track came when Alexander told the duo that he had just visited the Dreamland Margate amusement park. According to an interview in The Guardian, the trio wrote the track in 2017, with Alexander explaining, "I felt like I didn't want to write about politics simply because I felt like I should but then last week I wrote a song with the Pet Shop Boys. It's inspired by a fairground in Margate called Dreamland, but while I was writing it, Neil Tennant said to me, 'This makes sense right now with Trump closing the borders.' The song became something that touched on what's going on in the world. I'd write lyrics and he'd say, 'No, it needs to be more direct.' He'd take a simple line and interject a subversive political statement. That's the challenge as a pop writer, to do both at once".

Of the single, Pet Shop Boys said: "It's so exciting that our new single is a collaboration with Years & Years, one of the most original and successful bands to emerge this decade, and we really enjoyed writing and recording it with Olly Alexander". Alexander added, "It was a dream come true to create something with two of my heroes, and spending time with Chris and Neil was an absolute joy. I had to pinch myself repeatedly!"

Live performances 
During their headline slot at Radio 2 Live in Hyde Park, Pet Shop Boys performed "Dreamland" live for the first time with Years & Years frontman Olly Alexander joining them on stage. The Pet Shop Boys subsequently appeared as guests on Alexander's New Years & Years Eve special broadcast on BBC1, where they performed both "Dreamland" and "It's a Sin". Alexander later joined the Pet Shop Boys for a performance of the song at the 2022 Glastonbury Festival.

Track listings
CD single
"Dreamland" – 3:30
"An Open Mind" – 3:52
"No Boundaries" – 3:38
"Dreamland" (PSB remix) – 4:42
"Dreamland" ( vocal remix) – 5:06

Digital single
"Dreamland" – 3:28
"An Open Mind" – 3:52
"No Boundaries" – 3:40

Digital EP – Remixes
"Dreamland" (PSB remix) – 4:41
"Dreamland" (TWD vocal remix) – 5:06
"Dreamland" (TWD dub) – 4:58
"Dreamland" (Jacques Renault remix) – 5:45

12-inch single
A1. "Dreamland" – 3:30
A2. "Dreamland" (PSB remix) – 5:03
B1. "Dreamland" (TWD vocal remix) – 4:56
B2. "Dreamland" (TWD dub) – 5:44

Charts

References

2019 songs
2019 singles
Pet Shop Boys songs
Song recordings produced by Stuart Price
Songs written by Chris Lowe
Songs written by Neil Tennant
Songs written by Olly Alexander
Years & Years songs